Flat Top is an unincorporated community in Jefferson County, Alabama, United States.

History
A post office called Flattop was established in 1914, and remained in operation until it was discontinued in 1955.

References

Unincorporated communities in Jefferson County, Alabama
Unincorporated communities in Alabama